metacarpal veins can refer to:
 Dorsal metacarpal veins (venae metacarpales dorsales)
 Palmar metacarpal veins (venae metacarpales palmares)